The Saitama International Marathon is a women's marathon held in Saitama, Japan, and hosted by Japan Association of Athletics Federations, Saitama Prefecture, Saitama City, Nippon Television Network and the Yomiuri Shimbun. The event is an IAAF Silver Label Road Race.

The competition took the place of the Yokohama Women's Marathon which was held in Yokohama from 2009 until 2014 and itself a successor event to the Tokyo International Women's Marathon, which was held in Tokyo from 1979 until 2008. Following the creation of the annual Tokyo Marathon in 2007, which featured its own annual women's marathon, the sponsors decided to move the women's marathon to Yokohama in 2009 and then on to Saitama in 2015.

The first Saitama International Marathon held on 15 November 2015 also served as the selection race for Japan women's marathon representatives for 2016 Summer Olympics in Rio de Janeiro.

Winners
Key:

See also
Tokyo International Women's Marathon (1979–2008)
Yokohama Women's Marathon (2008–2014)

References

External links
  Saitama International Marathon official website
 2015 Official Results

Marathons in Japan
Recurring sporting events established in 2015
2015 establishments in Japan
November sporting events
Women's marathons in Japan